The Producers Guild Film Award for Best Actor in a Supporting Role (previously known as the Apsara Award for Best Actor in a Supporting Role) is given by the producers of the film and television guild as part of its annual award ceremony for Hindi films, to recognise a male actor who has delivered an outstanding performance in a supporting role. Following its inception in 2004, no one was awarded in 2005 and 2007.

† - indicates the performance also won the Filmfare Award
‡ - indicates the performance was also nominated for the Filmfare Award

Superlatives

Winners and nominees

2000s

 2004 Pankaj Kapur – Maqbool as Jahangir Khan (Abbaji)
 Arshad Warsi – Munna Bhai M.B.B.S. as Circuit ‡
 Irrfan Khan – Haasil as Ranvijay Singh
 Paresh Rawal – Hungama as Radheysham Tiwari
 Saif Ali Khan – Kal Ho Naa Ho as Rohit Patel †
 2005 – No award
 2006 Abhishek Bachchan – Yuva as Lallan Singh †
 Akshay Kumar – Mujhse Shaadi Karogi as Arun a.k.a. Sunny ‡
 Kay Kay Menon – Hazaaron Khwaishein Aisi as Siddharth Tyabji
 Nana Patekar – Apaharan as Tabrez
 Naseeruddin Shah – Iqbal as Mohit ‡
 2007 – No award
 2008 Irrfan Khan – Life in a... Metro as Monty †
 Darshan Jariwala – Gandhi, My Father as Mahatma Gandhi
 Mithun Chakraborty – Guru as Manik Dasgupta ‡
 Rajat Kapoor – Bheja Fry as Ranjeet Thadani
 2009 Jimmy Shergill – A Wednesday! as Arif Khan
 Pankaj Kapur – Halla Bol as Sidhu
 Purab Kohli – Rock On!! as KD
 Ravi Jhankal – Welcome to Sajjanpur as Munnibai Mukhanni
 Sonu Sood – Jodhaa Akbar as Rajkumar Sujamal ‡

2010s

 2010 Rishi Kapoor – Love Aaj Kal as Older Veer Singh
 Anupam Kher – Wake Up Sid as Ram Mehra
 Irrfan Khan – New York as Roshan
 Rishi Kapoor – Luck by Chance as Rommy Rolly ‡
 Vivek Oberoi – Kurbaan as Riyaz Masood
 2011 Arjun Rampal – Raajneeti as Prithviraj Pratap ‡
 Ajay Devgan – Raajneeti as Sooraj Kumar
 Emraan Hashmi – Once Upon a Time in Mumbaai as Shoaib Khan ‡
 Farooq Sheikh – Lahore as S.K. Rao
 Naseeruddin Shah – Ishqiya as Iftikhar a.k.a. Khalujan
 Raghubir Yadav – Peepli Live as Budhia
 2012 Farhan Akhtar – Zindagi Na Milegi Dobara as Imraan †
 Emraan Hashmi – The Dirty Picture as Abraham
 Gulshan Devaiya – Shaitan as Karan Chaudhary a.k.a. KC
 Naseeruddin Shah – The Dirty Picture as Suryakant ‡
 Rana Daggubati – Dum Maaro Dum as DJ Joaquim "Joki" Fernandes
 Randeep Hooda – Saheb, Biwi Aur Gangster as Lalit / Babloo
 2013 Annu Kapoor – Vicky Donor as Dr. Baldev Chaddha †
 Nawazuddin Siddiqui – Kahaani as Khan 
 Nawazuddin Siddiqui – Talaash: The Answer Lies Within as Taimur ‡
 Piyush Mishra – Gangs of Wasseypur as Nasir
 Saurabh Shukla – Barfi! as Sudhanshu Dutta
 2014 Nawazuddin Siddiqui – The Lunchbox as Shaikh †
 Aditya Roy Kapur – Yeh Jawaani Hai Deewani as Avinash "Avi" ‡
 Abhay Deol – Raanjhanaa as Jasjeet Singh Shergill/Akram Zaidi
 Arjun Rampal – D-Day as Captain Rudra Pratap Singh
 Saif Ali Khan – Go Goa Gone as Boris
 Saurabh Shukla – Jolly LLB as Justice Tripathi

 2016 Nawazuddin Siddiqui – Bajrangi Bhaijaan as Chand Nawab

See also
Producers Guild Film Awards
Producers Guild Film Award for Best Actor in a Leading Role

References

Producers Guild Film Awards